Jimmy Gomez (born November 25, 1974) is an American politician serving as the U.S. representative for  since 2017. His district includes the Los Angeles neighborhoods of Eagle Rock, Boyle Heights, Downtown Los Angeles, Koreatown, and other communities. A member of the Democratic Party, Gomez served in the California State Assembly from 2012 to 2017.

Before entering electoral politics, Gomez was a labor organizer, serving as the legislative and political director for the United Nurses Associations of California/Union of Health-Care Professionals (UNAC/UHCP) and the political representative for the American Federation of State, County, and Municipal Employees (AFSCME).

Gomez serves on the House Ways and Means Committee, and is vice chair of the Committee on Oversight and Reform. He is a founding member of the Medicare for All Caucus. He is also a member of the Congressional Hispanic Caucus, the Congressional Progressive Caucus, the Congressional Asian Pacific American Caucus, and the Congressional LGBTQ Equality Caucus.

Early life and education 
Born and raised in Southern California, Gomez is the son of working-class immigrant parents. His mother was a domestic worker and a nursing home laundry attendant. His father was a bracero (farm worker).

After graduating from high school, without any plans to attend college, Gomez worked at Subway and Target.  He eventually attended Riverside Community College and earned his B.A. in political science with a minor in urban planning from the University of California, Los Angeles and his M.A. in public policy from the Harvard Kennedy School.

A former labor organizer, Gomez worked for the United Nurses Associations of California/Union of Health Care Professionals (UNAC/UHCP) in 2009. He also served as the Political Representative for the American Federation of State, County, and Municipal Employees (AFSCME).

Gomez was a staffer for former U.S. Representative Hilda Solis. He was elected to the California State Assembly in 2012, and served there until his election to Congress.

"To see her son not only go to college, graduate, but then to run for public office and get elected ... it means a lot. It means that there's still a lot of opportunities for immigrants ... It means we're part of this larger American story", said Gomez.

California State Assembly

Gomez was a member of the California State Assembly, representing the 51st district. He was first elected in 2012, and reelected in 2014 with over 83% of the vote. California's 51st Assembly district includes Northeast Los Angeles and unincorporated East Los Angeles. He served as State Assembly Majority Whip from 2013 to 2014.

Gomez was a member of the California Latino Legislative Caucus. Before being elected to the Assembly in 2012, he was the political director for the United Nurses Association of California, an affiliate of the American Federation of State, County, and Municipal Employees.

U.S. House of Representatives

Elections

2017 

Gomez received endorsements from Los Angeles Mayor Eric Garcetti, Assembly Speaker Anthony Rendon and Senate leader Kevin de León, among others.

On April 4, 2017, Gomez came in first during the special election. Since he did not receive a majority of the vote, he faced a fellow Democrat, Los Angeles City Planning Commissioner Robert Lee Ahn, the runner-up, in a special runoff election on June 6. Gomez won with 60% of the vote. He is only the third person to represent this district since its creation in 1963 (it was numbered as the 30th from 1963 to 1975, the 25th from 1975 to 1993, the 30th from 1993 to 2003, the 31st from 2003 to 2013, and has been the 34th since 2017). Ed Roybal won this district in 1963 and handed it to Becerra in 1993.

2018 
Gomez faced Green Party candidate Kenneth Mejia in the general election and won with 72.5% of the vote.

2020 

Gomez was challenged in the 2020 election by MacArthur Park Neighborhood Council board member and fellow Democrat David Kim. On November 3, Gomez defeated Kim in a closer than expected race, with 53% of the vote to Kim's 47%.

2022 

David Kim challenged Gomez again in 2022. Gomez won, but by a smaller margin than in 2020.

Tenure 
Gomez's term began on June 6, 2017. He was sworn into office on July 11, 2017.

On October 1, 2020, Gomez co-signed a letter to Secretary of State Mike Pompeo that condemned Azerbaijan’s offensive operations against the Armenian-populated enclave of Nagorno-Karabakh, denounced Turkey’s role in the Nagorno-Karabakh conflict, and called for an immediate ceasefire.

In November 2020, Gomez was named a candidate for United States Trade Representative in the Biden administration.

In January 2021, Gomez introduced legislation to expel Representative Marjorie Taylor Greene from the House for some of her social media postings from before her 2020 election to Congress.

After Greene heckled President Biden at his State of the Union address on March 2, 2022, Gomez once again introduced a resolution of expulsion, but added Representative Lauren Boebert, who had joined her in the heckling. Gomez also spoke about the "triggering" feeling he experienced after he returned to the Congressional Gallery for the first time since right-wing insurrectionists had attacked those chambers in an attempt to halt the counting of electoral votes on January 6, 2021.

Leadership posts 

 Assistant whip, Democratic Caucus of the House of Representatives
 Vice chair, Committee on Oversight and Reform
 Racial Equity Initiative, Committee on Ways and Means 
 House Trade Working Group

Committee assignments
Committee on Ways and Means
Subcommittee on Health 
Subcommittee on Worker and Family Support 
 Committee on Oversight and Reform
Subcommittee on Environment

Caucuses
Gomez is a member of several dozen caucuses. A full list is available at his website. 
Congressional Dads Caucus (Chair)
Congressional Medicare for all Caucus 
Congressional Progressive Caucus
Congressional Hispanic Caucus
Congressional Asian Pacific American Caucus
Congressional LGBTQ Equality Caucus
Congressional Pro-Choice Caucus 
Future Forum

Political positions

Abortion 
Gomez has a 100% rating from NARAL Pro-Choice America and an F rating from the Susan B. Anthony List for his abortion-related voting record. Gomez opposed the overturning of Roe v. Wade.

Climate and environment 
Gomez received a lifetime score of 98% from the League of Conservation Voters based on 2017-2021 annual scores. He has expressed support for a Green New Deal.

Human and civil rights 
Gomez received a score of 100 from the Human Rights Campaign for both the 115th and 116th Congresses. The American Civil Liberties Union gave him scores of 95% and 83% for the 115th and 116th Congresses, respectively.

Electoral history

2014 California State Assembly election

2016 California State Assembly election

2017 congressional special election

2018 congressional election 

New York Times Results

2020 congressional election

2022 congressional election

Personal life

Gomez is married to Mary Hodge, an aide to Eric Garcetti. They live in Eagle Rock, California.

Awards
2022 NHMC Impact Awards: Washington D.C. (Impact Award Public Service)

See also
 List of Hispanic and Latino Americans in the United States Congress

References

External links 

 Congressman Gomez official U.S. House website
 Jimmy Gomez for Congress campaign website
 
 

|-

|-

1974 births
21st-century American politicians
American politicians of Mexican descent
Hispanic and Latino American state legislators in California
Hispanic and Latino American members of the United States Congress
Harvard Kennedy School alumni
Living people
Democratic Party members of the California State Assembly
People from Echo Park, Los Angeles
University of California, Los Angeles alumni
Democratic Party members of the United States House of Representatives from California